In mathematics, Fischer's inequality gives an upper bound for the determinant of a  positive-semidefinite matrix whose entries are complex numbers in terms of the determinants of its principal diagonal blocks. 
Suppose A, C are respectively p×p, q×q positive-semidefinite complex matrices and B is a p×q complex matrix.
Let 
 
so that M is a (p+q)×(p+q) matrix.

Then Fischer's inequality states that 
 
If M is positive-definite, equality is achieved in Fischer's inequality if and only if all the entries of B are 0. Inductively one may conclude that a similar inequality holds for a block decomposition of M with multiple principal diagonal blocks. Considering 1×1 blocks, a corollary is Hadamard's inequality. On the other hand, Fischer's inequality can also be proved by using Hadamard's inequality, see the proof of Theorem 7.8.5 in Horn and Johnson's Matrix Analysis.

Proof
Assume that A and C are positive-definite. Let 
 
We note that

By multiplicativity of determinant, we have 

In this case, equality holds if and only if M = D that is, all entries of B are 0.

Taking the limit as  proves the inequality. From the inequality we note that if M is invertible, then both A and C are invertible and we get the desired equality condition.

Improvements 
If M can be partitioned in square blocks Mij, then the following inequality by Thompson is valid:

 

where [det(Mij)] is the matrix whose (i,j) entry is det(Mij).

In particular, if the block matrices B and C are also square matrices, then the following inequality by Everett is valid:

 

Thompson's inequality can also be generalized by an inequality in terms of the coefficients of the characteristic polynomial of the block matrices. Expressing the characteristic polynomial of the matrix A as

 

and supposing that the blocks Mij are m x m matrices, the following inequality by Lin and Zhang is valid:

 

Note that if r = m, then this inequality is identical to Thompson's inequality.

See also
 Hadamard's inequality

Notes

References

 .
 .

Inequalities
Determinants